The Athabasca Landing Trail was a long-distance portage route that linked Fort Edmonton (modern day Edmonton, Alberta) on the North Saskatchewan River with Athabasca Landing (modern day Athabasca, Alberta) on the Athabasca River.

The Saskatchewan flows east and joins the Nelson River which then drains into Hudson Bay. The Athabasca flows north and joins the Slave River, which itself joins the Mackenzie River which drains into the Arctic Ocean. The portage, therefore, had local economic significance but was also part of a wider trade network that linked the Arctic and sub-arctic to the rest of North America.

Various portage routes between the two rivers had been used by the indigenous peoples of the region for centuries before the arrival of British and Canadian fur traders in region in the late eighteenth century. Once fur trading posts were established in the region, the same simple trails were also used to move freight between the posts. They linked Edmonton House (in all of its various incarnations over the years), the centre of the Saskatchewan District, to posts in the Athabasca District (including the Peace River Country) such as Dunvegan, Fort St. Mary's, Fort Chipewyan, and Fort Vermilion.  The main packroute northwards from Edmonton from 1824 to 1876 was that to Fort Assiniboine, well to the west of the later Athabasca Landing Trail.  It was due to Hudson's Bay Company scouts seeking an alternative to the Fort Assiniboine route that Athabasca Landing was founded in 1876.

The North-West Mounted Police stationed nine officers at Athabasca Landing in 1893.

In 2010, a conceptual master plan for the modern version of the Athabasca Landing Trail was completed. The plan is to build a  non-motorized recreational trail, which runs between Fort Saskatchewan and Athabasca, and highlights the region's historic and natural features. The route is also designated as part of the Trans Canada Trail; it links to the River Valley Alliance Trail in the south and to both the land and water routes north to the Arctic Ocean.

See also
 York Factory Express

References

Portages in Canada
Athabasca, Alberta
Events of National Historic Significance (Canada)
Historic trails and roads in Alberta
Hudson's Bay Company
Rupert's Land
North-Western Territory